Wilde's Domain is a 1982 Australian TV movie about a circus family.

References

External links

1982 television films
1982 films
Australian television films